Salpa may refer to:
 Salpa (singular salp), a barrel-shaped, planktic tunicate
 Salpa (genus), a genus of tunicates in the family Salpidae
 Salon Palloilijat, association football club from Salo, Finland.
 Salpa Line, a bunker line on the eastern border of Finland.
 The previous name of Seppa, a town in Arunachal Pradesh, India.